A deely bobber (also deeley bobber, or deeley bopper) is a novelty item of headgear comprising a headband to which are affixed two springy protrusions resembling the antennae of insects. These "antennae" may be topped with simple plastic shapes or more elaborate and fanciful decorations, such as mini pom poms or light-emitting diodes. The name "deely bobber" is a genericized trademark; other names include deely-boppers, bonce boppers, or space boppers. In June 1982, a headline of The New York Times called them Martian antennae.

Origin
Stephen Askin invented the original deely bobber in 1981, inspired by the "Killer Bees" costumes on Saturday Night Live. Askin was a serial entrepreneur who had sold dartboards depicting Ayatollah Khomeini during the Iran hostage crisis of 1980.  Askin made prototype Deely Bobbers in his kitchen and test-marketed them at the Los Angeles Street Fair of summer 1981, selling 800 at $5 each. He sold the invention to the Ace Novelty Co. of Bellevue, Washington, which launched it in January 1982 at the California Gift Fair.  The name "Deely Bobber" was suggested by the wife of John Minkove, an Ace marketer; it had been her schoolfriend's placeholder name for "thingamajig". It was previously a brand of toy block sold 1969–1973.

Deely bobbers began retailing in April 1982 at US$3. They quickly became a fad in the United States, before reaching the United Kingdom in July. At the 1982 World's Fair in Knoxville, Tennessee, 10,000 a day were sold; total sales by August were estimated at 2 million, with Askin getting 5% of the wholesale price.  Imitations costing $1–2 undercut the original, though Askin applied for a patent. The original decorations for the antennae were polystyrene shapes covered in sparkles: spheres, stars, hearts. Flashing lights were added to cash in on the hit movie E.T. the Extra-Terrestrial, with seasonal themes for later holidays.

References

Headgear
1980s fads and trends
Party equipment
Novelty items
Products introduced in 1981